The First Cannabis Church of Logic and Reason is a cannabis-based religious movement based in Lansing, Michigan. It held its first non-denominational service in June 2016. The service was led by Jeremy Hall, an ordained minister and medical cannabis patient. Under Lansing city law, the church may not be penalized for allowing possession or consumption on its private property.

See also
 Cannabis and religion
 Cannabis in Michigan
 First Church of Cannabis

References

2016 establishments in Michigan
2016 in cannabis
Cannabis and religion
Cannabis in Michigan
Churches in Michigan
Culture of Lansing, Michigan
Religious belief systems founded in the United States